Rafa García may refer to:
 Rafa García (footballer)
 Rafa García (fighter)
 Rafa García (basketball)

See also
 Rafael García (disambiguation)